State Trunk Highway 83 (often called Highway 83, STH-83 or WIS 83) is a state highway in the U.S. state of Wisconsin. It runs north–south in southeast Wisconsin from Hartford to the Illinois border in the village of Salem Lakes.

Most of the WIS 83 corridor consists of glacial formations and lakes. From the Washington County line south to the Illinois state line, WIS 83 runs within a few miles of at least 11 different small lakes. The rural nature of this routing results in WIS 83 being mostly two-lane undivided highway except for sections where it runs concurrent with other highways (WIS 50 and WIS 36), or where it approaches an Interstate (I-43 and I-94).

Route description
WIS 83 begins at the Wisconsin–Illinois state line, just north of Antioch, Illinois, at the northern terminus of Illinois Route 83 (IL 83). WIS 83 heads north through Salem through the Westosha region of Kenosha County as Antioch Road.

On the western edge of Paddock Lake, WIS 83 turns left on 75th Street and runs concurrently with WIS 50. WIS 75 continues north on 256th Avenue towards Kansasville.

Outside of the town of Wheatland, WIS 83 turns northwest from WIS 50, crossing into Racine County and then heading into the city of Burlington as South Pine Street.

By the end of 2008, WIS 83 will run along the new Burlington Bypass around the east side of the city, with an interchange at WIS 142, an at-grade four-way stoplight at WIS 11, another interchange at County Trunk Highway A (CTH-A), and finally an on/off ramp at WIS 36 (North Milwaukee Avenue) northeast of Browns Lake. The entire length of the eastern portion of the bypass will be signed as WIS 83 until the western section is completed sometime around the fall of 2010.

WIS 83 and WIS 36 continue northeast on North Milwaukee Avenue to the intersection with WIS 20 (Beck Drive) outside of the city of Waterford. WIS 83 turns northwest onto Beck Drive, running concurrently with WIS 20 through Waterford. Upon reaching the city limits, Beck Drive becomes South 1st Street in Waterford, ending at East Main Street.

At the corner of East Main and South 1st, WIS 83/WIS 20 turns west across the Fox River onto West Main Street, heading northwest and out of the city of Waterford. On the western edge of the city, WIS 83 turns towards the northwest while WIS 20 continues due west as High Drive.

WIS 83 continues towards the northwest, briefly crossing into Walworth County for less than a mile before heading into Waukesha County and the Village of Mukwonago. On the southeast side of Mukwonago, WIS 83 crosses I-43 at exit number 43.

WIS 83 runs through the village of Mukwonago as Rochester Street, winding under a railway trestle and through to its odd-angle downtown intersection with CTH-ES (Main Street/Fox Street).

WIS 83 continues north towards the unincorporated communities of Genesee and Genesee Depot. Between the two towns, WIS 83 crosses WIS 59, turning to the west for about three blocks and crossing the railroad track that give the latter town its name.

At the west end of Genesee Depot, WIS 83 abruptly turns to the north towards Wales. Continuing west on Depot Road leads to Ten Chimneys National Historic Landmark, the former home of Alfred Lunt and Lynn Fontanne.

WIS 83 heads north through the Kettle Moraine area of western Waukesha County, crossing US 18 on the northwest side of Wales.

Entering the town of Delafield, WIS 83 crosses I-94 at exit 287. Continuing north, WIS 83 passes Naga-Waukee County Park and Golf Course towards Hartland.

After crossing over the WIS 16 freeway in Hartland (exit 181), WIS 83 turns immediately west on Church Street, running parallel to the WIS 16 freeway for about a half-mile through the village of Chenequa. Heading north between Pine Lake and Beaver Lake into the community of  Merton, WIS 83 crosses into Washington County.

Continuing north, WIS 83 meets the western terminus of WIS 167 at Holy Hill Road. WIS 83 continues to the north into Hartford, entering the city on Grand Avenue.

At the intersection of Grand Avenue and Branch Street, WIS 83 turns to the northwest on Branch into downtown Hartford, becoming South Main Street one block south of WIS 60 (East Sumner Street). WIS 83 continues north on North Main for four blocks, passing Centennial Park before turning east on Union Street. About nine blocks to the east, Union Street curves towards the north and heads out of the city,

WIS 83 continues to the north, passing the Washington County Golf Course to its northern terminus with WIS 175.

History
The original signing of WIS 83 in 1919 was along the general routing of the current WIS 83 between WIS 36 in Waterford and WIS 59 in Genesee. The route was expanded to its current termini by 1924 and has remained in the same location up until 2021 when the route was truncated at WIS 60 in Hartford.

Major intersections

See also

References

External links

083
Transportation in Kenosha County, Wisconsin
Transportation in Racine County, Wisconsin
Transportation in Walworth County, Wisconsin
Transportation in Waukesha County, Wisconsin
Transportation in Washington County, Wisconsin